Magnistipula conrauana is a species of plant in the family Chrysobalanaceae. It is endemic to Cameroon.  Its natural habitats are subtropical or tropical moist lowland forests and subtropical or tropical moist montane forests. It is threatened by habitat loss.

References

Chrysobalanaceae
Endemic flora of Cameroon
Endangered plants
Taxonomy articles created by Polbot